Sylvia Michel (born 25 December 1935) is a Swiss Reformed minister. She served as Europe's first female church council president by being elected to the position for the Reformed Church of Aargau. A church award is named after her. She also served as president of a working group concerning South Africa.

References

Further reading
 Claudia Bandixen, Silvia Pfeiffer & Frank Worbs (eds.) Wenn Frauen Kirche leiten: neuer Trend in den reformierten Kirchen der Schweiz, Zürich, 2006

External links 
 Sylvia-Michel-Preis

1935 births
Living people
People from Aargau
Swiss Calvinist and Reformed ministers
20th-century Calvinist and Reformed ministers